The Arkansas Razorback women's golf team represents the University of Arkansas in the sport of golf. The Razorbacks compete in Division I of the National Collegiate Athletic Association (NCAA) and the Southeastern Conference (SEC). They play their home events on the Blessings Golf Course near the Fayetteville, Arkansas campus. They are coached by Shauna Estes-Taylor.

Team history 

The Razorback women's golf team began in 1996–97 when Director of Women's Athletics Bev Lewis, added the program for the then-separate Women's Athletics Department. Since that time, Arkansas has made 12 NCAA Regional appearances and six NCAA Championship appearances. The Razorbacks' most famous alum is LPGA Tour member Stacy Lewis.

All-American 
Four Razorback women's golfers have earned 10 Duramed Futures Tour National Golf Coaches Association All-America honors. They include Stacy Lewis (2005 1st team, 2006 Hon. Mention, 2007 1st team, 2008  1st team), Amanda McCurdy (2006 Hon. Mention), Kelli Shean (2010 2nd team, 2011 Hon. Mention), and Emily Tubert (2011 1st team, 2012 1st team, 2013 Hon. Mention).

All-Southeastern Conference 
Eight Arkansas Razorback women's golf team members have been honored by the Southeastern Conference:

Emma Lavy
2011 SEC All-Freshman Team

Stacy Lewis
2005 First-Team
2005 Freshman of the Year
2005 All-Freshman Team
2006 First-Team
2007 First-Team
2008 First-Team
2008 SEC Golfer of the Year
2008 Golf Scholar-Athlete of the Year
2008 H. Boyd McWhorter Scholar-Athlete

Gaby López
2013 Second-Team
2013 SEC All-Freshman Team

Amanda McCurdy
2004 Second-Team
2005 Second-Team
2006 First-Team

Lucy Nunn
2009 Second-Team

Regina Plasencia
2013 SEC All-Freshman Team

Kelli Shean
2008 All Freshman Team
2010 First-Team
2011 Second-Team

Emily Tubert
2011 First-Team
2011 SEC Co-Freshman of the Year
2011 SEC All-Freshman Team
2012 First-Team
2013 First-Team

Coaching staff 
Shauna Estes-Taylor became the head coach in 2007. Other Razorback head coaches include Sue Ertl (1994–96); Ulrika (Fisher) Belline (1996–2002); and Kelley Hester (2002–07).

References 

 
Golf in Arkansas
Women's golf in the United States